Lale Karci (born 15 November 1969) is a Turkish-German actress and model.

Filmography

Television

References

External links

1969 births
Living people
German television actresses
German female models
German people of Turkish descent